Los Vaqueros (English: The Cowboys) is a collaboration album by Wisin & Yandel featuring the artists from their record label WY Records. It was nominated for a Lo Nuestro Award for Urban Album of the Year.

Content
It features the following artists: Wisin & Yandel, Gadiel, Franco "El Gorila", Yomille Omar "El Tio", Tony Dize with guest appearances by Don Omar, Gallego and Héctor el Father. This album is the "baby" of Wisin & Yandel's recently emerged WY Records, for being the first production by the record label. Besides participating in the vocals, Herson Cifuentes was as well active in the production and development of Los Vaqueros. The Puerto Rican duo, as founders of WY Records, introduced Franco "El Gorilla", Gadiel, and El Tío to the genre for the first time with a more broad promotion by featuring them in several songs on this album. Not too long after the release of Los Vaqueros, a Collector's Edition was released by the company, which included the original CD but with four extra songs plus an extra DVD with two music video clips, an interview, and a photo shot session video.

Track listing

Wild Wild Mixes

Los Vaqueros: Wild Wild Mixes is a remix album of Los Vaqueros released on July 24, 2007.

Charts

Certifications

See also
List of number-one Billboard Latin Rhythm Albums of 2007

References

2006 albums
Wisin & Yandel albums
Machete Music albums